During the 1994–95 English football season, Charlton Athletic F.C. competed in the Football League First Division.

Season summary
Charlton started the campaign very poorly, managing only six wins before Christmas and were hovering towards the relegation places. Their form then started to improve into the new year with 7 wins from 15, picking up 23 points from the possible 45 during that steady run. Despite an inconsistent season, the Addicks avoided any danger of relegation and finished in 15th place.

Final league table

Results
Charlton Athletic's score comes first

Legend

Football League First Division

FA Cup

League Cup

Players

First-team squad
Squad at end of season

References

Notes

Charlton Athletic F.C. seasons
Charlton Athletic